Juan José Maglio (1904 - 1964) was an Argentine professional football player. He played in nine matches for the Argentina national football team from 1925 to 1931. He was also part of Argentina's squad for the 1927 South American Championship.

Career
Maglio played club football for San Lorenzo de Almagro and Club de Gimnasia y Esgrima La Plata. He moved to Italy to continue his football career.

Personal
Maglio was the son of famous tango dancer, Juan Ignacio Maglio ("Pacho"). Maglio formed a successful orchestra while playing football in Italy.

References

External links
Maglio at Enciclopediadelcalcio.it

1904 births
1964 deaths
Argentine footballers
Argentina international footballers
Club Almagro players
San Lorenzo de Almagro footballers
Ferro Carril Oeste footballers
Club de Gimnasia y Esgrima La Plata footballers
Serie A players
Juventus F.C. players
Chacarita Juniors footballers
Club Atlético Vélez Sarsfield footballers
Argentine Primera División players
Copa América-winning players
Association football midfielders